Joel Silverman (born December 21, 1958) is a celebrity animal trainer who hosted Good Dog U on Animal Planet from 1999–2009.

Early life

Joel Silverman grew up in Southern California and at the age of 13, the first animal he ever trained was the family dog, Shadow. At about the same time, he and his family spent their summer vacations in San Diego and would go to SeaWorld every year, and after a number of summers watching the trainers riding the killer whales, Silverman developed a fascination with the whales and trainers. At the age of 16, he got hired to pick up trash at SeaWorld, and after helping out the trainers and years of hard work, Silverman was hired as a trainer. He started off with Pacific and Atlantic bottle-nosed dolphins, California sea lions, and eventually killer whales.

 In 1983 Silverman shifted his focus into training animals for movies TV shows and commercials, and currently training animals for film and TV.
 
 From 1988 to 1992 Joel was the trainer of Dreyfuss from the TV series Empty Nest.
 
 In 1989, Joel wrote and hosted his first dog training video called, Joel Silverman's Hollywood Dog Training Program. It was sold as an infomercial and had sold over 300,000 videos at that time.
 
 In 1999, Joel hosted his first TV series called, "GOOD DOG U" which aired on Animal Planet from 1999–2009.

Dog Training Style

Although there are a variety of styles and methods to train dogs, Joel Silverman's style is what he calls a "hybrid" dog training method. This method combines parts of dog training he learned from training dolphins, sea lions, and killer whales, as well as the training of dogs. Joel also adds a personality based dog training style called What Color is Your Dog? This method teaches people that there is no "one size fits all" approach to dog training. He believes dogs should be trained based solely on their personalities.

Partial TV & Film Credits

 1988-1992 - Empty Nest - Dog Trainer
 1997-2014 - IAMS National print and commercials - Dog & Cat Trainer/Animal coordinator
 2005 - A Good Year - Dog Trainer
 Full List - IMDb

Videos

 1989 - The Hollywood Dog Training Program
 1999 - "Unleashed" - A series of videos for the PETCO pet store chain
 2009–Present - Joel Silverman's Dog Training DVD Series

Authored Books

 What Color is Your Dog? (2009)  - Explains how to train a dog based on the dog's personality.
 Take 2 - Training Solutions to Rescued Dogs (2010) - Explains how to find the right dog to adopt, as well helps the reader with problem solving issues.
 [http://www.companionsforlife.net/joels-style/joel-s-silverman-s-signed-books/bond-with-your-heart-book Bond with Your Heart, Train with Your Brain] (2012) - A self-help book for parents, teachers, managers, and supervisors for building a better relationship.. all animal based.
 More What Color is Your Dog?'' (2015) - Follow up book to Joel's first book What Color is Your Dog? Explains how to train a dog based on the dog's personality.

Playing Self in Commercials

In October 2014, Chase bank was looking for people that they thought had mastered their careers, and contacted Joel Silverman and asked him to be involved with their new Chase Mastery Campaign. This campaign involved Joel Silverman. Serena Williams, Tim Morehouse, and The Rockettes. Joel's pictures were in most of the Chase banks for a good portion of 2015, and Joel's dog Duchess starred with him in the commercial and was seen in the banks, taking the receipt, and holding it in her mouth. From August 2015 to April 2016, this commercial aired nearly 4,000 times nationally.
https://www.ispot.tv/ad/7U7g/jpmorgan-chase-chase-mastery-dog-trainer-feat-joel-silverman

Joel Silverman's Dog Trainer Certification Course

In January, 2017, Joel Silverman launched his "hands on" Dog Trainer Certification Course. This course is for individuals looking for a career in dog training. Silverman selects four to five dogs from a local humane society somewhere in the U.S., and over a five-day period, the students train the dogs to sit, stay, come, heel, lie down, and "go to a place".

Television Series

 Hosted Good Dog U on Animal Planet - 1999 to 2010
 Hosted, wrote and directed What Color is Your Dog? 2011–Present

Awards

 2008 "Dog Trainer of the Year" Purina Pro Plan 54th Annual Show Dogs Dinner
 1986 (IMATA) International Marine Animal Trainers Association "Behavior of the Year Award" - "THE TRIPLE BOW" on two Atlantic bottle-nosed dolphins

References

External links
 

Living people
1958 births
American television personalities
Animal trainers
Dog trainers